St Agnes Balika Maha Vidyalaya is a school situated in Balangoda, Sabaragamuwa Province, Sri Lanka. The school provides primary and secondary education to girls aged 6 to 19 and has a student population of around 1,400.

Motto 
Proceed with courage

Houses 
The students are divided into four houses. The houses are led by house captains, competing in all major games to win the inter-house competition. The houses and their colors are:
 Cecilia - Yellow
 Reta - Red
 Gretan - Green
 Ludes - Blue

References

Schools in Ratnapura District